In mathematics,  the matching distance is a metric on the space of size functions.

The core of the definition of matching distance is the observation that the
information contained in a size function can be combinatorially stored in a formal series of lines and points of the plane, called respectively cornerlines  and cornerpoints.

multiplicities, augmented by adding a countable infinity of points  of the
diagonal .

 

Roughly speaking, the matching distance 
between two size functions is the minimum, over all the matchings
between the cornerpoints of the two size functions, of the maximum
of the -distances between two matched cornerpoints. Since
two size functions can have a different number of cornerpoints,
these can be also matched to points of the diagonal . Moreover, the definition of  implies that matching two points of the diagonal has no cost.

See also
 Size theory
 Size function
 Size functor
 Size homotopy group
 Natural pseudodistance

References

Topology